KIUN 1400 AM is a radio station licensed to Pecos, Texas.  The station broadcasts a country music format and is owned by Pecos Radio Co., Inc.

References

External links
KIUN's official website

IUN
Country radio stations in the United States